The Northern Ireland (Temporary Provisions) Act 1972 (c. 22) was an Act of the Parliament of the United Kingdom that introduced direct rule in Northern Ireland with effect from 30 March 1972.

The act, which took effect immediately on receiving royal assent, provided as follows:
 A new Secretary of State for Northern Ireland was to take over the government functions of Northern Ireland's ceremonial Governor and its executive cabinet ministers, and heads of government departments
 The Attorney General for England and Wales was to take over the duties of the Attorney General for Northern Ireland.
 The Parliament of Northern Ireland was (in effect) indefinitely prorogued, with its legislative powers being made available for exercise by the British Government by Order in Council.

The political institutions that were put into abeyance by this Act were formally abolished the following year by the Northern Ireland Constitution Act 1973.

Reaction
Prominent Northern Ireland MP, William Craig described the enactment of the legislation as "Ulster's El Alamein".

References

External links
 Copy of the text of the Act at the CAIN website

Constitutional laws of Northern Ireland
History of Northern Ireland
Politics of Northern Ireland
United Kingdom Acts of Parliament 1972
1972 in Northern Ireland
Acts of the Parliament of the United Kingdom concerning Northern Ireland
Emergency laws in the United Kingdom